Qualification for the 2017 FIBA Asia Cup were held to determine the participants in the 2017 FIBA Asia Cup. Lebanon secured qualification by being named as hosts. The other fifteen berths were disputed per FIBA Asia zone, and via the 2016 FIBA Asia Challenge.

Qualification format
The following are eligible to participate:
 The three best teams from the subzone of East Asia, the two best teams from the subzone of West Asia and the Winners from the subzones of Central Asia, South Asia, Southeast Asia, and the Persian Gulf.
 The five best-placed teams from the previous FIBA Asia Challenge would qualify the same number of teams for their respective subzones.
 The host nation would clinch one of the berths allocated for its subzone.

* Including the host nation Lebanon.

Qualified teams 

* Lebanon is also the 2017 West Asian Champions.

FIBA Asia Challenge 

The 6th FIBA Asia Challenge was held at Tehran, Iran from 9 to 18 September 2016.

Central Asia 
The 2017 Central Asian Qualifying Round was a one-game playoff between Kazakhstan and Kyrgyzstan in Almaty.

East Asia 

The 4th EABA Championship was held in Nagano, Japan from 3 to 7 June 2017. The top five nations will qualify for the main tournament. On 7 June 2017,  defeated the defending champions  in the final, 77–64. Hosts  subdued  in the bronze medal game, 76–58.
The draw was held in Tokyo, Japan on 6 March 2017 to determine the composition of the two groups.

Preliminary round

Group A

Group B

Classification 5th–6th
 Winner qualifies to the 2017 FIBA Asia Cup.

Final round

Semifinals

3rd place

Final

Final standing

Gulf 

The 15th Gulf Basketball Championship was held in Sharjah, United Arab Emirates in September 2016.

South Asia 

 
The 6th SABA Championship was held in Malé, Maldives from 19 May to 23 May 2017.

Standings

Results
All times are in Maldivian Time (UTC+05:00)

Final rankings

Southeast Asia 

The 12th SEABA Championship was held in Quezon City, Philippines from 12 to 18 May 2017.

West Asia 

The 15th WABA Championship was held in Amman, Jordan from 29 January to 2 February 2017. Only the top four teams excluding Lebanon qualified for the continental joust.

References

qualification
FIBA
FIBA